The Hermitage of Agios Vasileios, also sometimes referred to as the Skete of St. Basil, is an Orthodox skete on Mount Athos.

The peak of Karmilio Oros (Καρμήλιο Όρος; "Mount Carmel"; elevation: 887 m) lies directly to the northeast of the Skete of St. Basil. The Holy Chapel of the Holy Glorious Prophet Elijah (Ιερόν Παρεκκλήσιον Αγίου ενδόξου Προφήτου Ηλιού) and some radio towers sit on top of the peak. A footpath connects the skete to the peak, as well as with the Stavros junction (elevation: 730 m), where there are footpaths that lead to the Skete of St. Anne, Kerasia, and Great Lavra.

Notable residents
Notable monks who lived at the skete include St. Joseph the Hesychast and his brotherhood, including disciples Arsenios the Cave Dweller and others.

Paisius Velichkovsky was also a resident of the skete.

References

Sketes in Mount Athos
Greek Orthodox monasteries
Great Lavra